Heddon-on-the-Wall railway station served the village of Heddon-on-the-Wall, Northumberland, England from 1881 to 1958.

History 
The station opened in July 1881 by the Scotswood, Newburn and Wylam Railway. It was situated where Station Road (southeast of Heddon village) meets the National Cycle Route, which follows the railway trackbed. Lemington colliery had to be moved north to accommodate the up platform. Nearby were Heddon Colliery and firebrick works, Bank Farm and Sir John Jackson sidings. In 1911, 14,124 tickets were sold but this dropped to 2,428 in 1951. The station closed to both passengers and goods traffic on 15 September 1958.

References

External links 

Disused railway stations in Northumberland
Former North Eastern Railway (UK) stations
Railway stations in Great Britain opened in 1881
Railway stations in Great Britain closed in 1958
1881 establishments in England
1958 disestablishments in England